The Casa Grande Union High School District is the high school district for Casa Grande, Arizona. It operates Casa Grande Union and Vista Grande high schools, which each have some 1,650 students.

References

External links
 

School districts in Pinal County, Arizona
Casa Grande, Arizona